Gisulf was the Duke of Spoleto from 759 to 761.

In 758, Desiderius, after putting down a revolt of the Duke Alboin, took control of the Duchy of Spoleto until April of the next year, when he appointed Gisulf to govern the duchy in his name. Gisulf reigned until 761, when he died or was deposed. He was replaced sometime between September 762 and March 763 by Theodicius, another follower of Desiderius.

References

Sources
Hodgkin, Thomas. Italy and her Invaders. Clarendon Press: 1895.
Medieval Lands Project: Northern Italy — Spoleto.

761 deaths
8th-century dukes of Spoleto
Year of birth unknown